Old Harlow is the historic part of the new town and district of Harlow, Essex in England.

Old Harlow is situated in the north-east area of the town and is the oldest area of the town. Old Harlow pre-dates the first written record in the Domesday Book of 1086, so it is unknown when the town first came into existence. Originally Old Harlow was going to be the central area of Harlow New Town, but due to the amount of demolition works and the loss of agricultural land it was decided to build Harlow New Town to the west of Old Harlow. As Harlow New Town was being built, Old Harlow seemed to be forgotten and fell behind in its development. It was not until 1977 that Old Harlow was improved with the building of a health service and a senior citizens day centre. Old Harlow still remains village-like with two Grade I listed buildings and many Grade II listed buildings.

Old Harlow ward has a total population of 5,845 and comprises 2,498 homes.

History
Old Harlow was known as Harlow before the building of Harlow New Town, at which point it was renamed Old Harlow and became a ward of the new town. It is now known to be an affluent area and it attracts a premium with its cottages and periodic manors. 

The High Street has various shops, cafés and restaurants. Opposite the High Street runs Fore Street and Market Street, where there are three of the Old Town pubs, the Chequers, the Marquis of Granby and the Crown. At the other end of High Street is the Green Man Hotel.

The town is served by Harlow Baptist Church and St Mary's Church. The town also contains a small extension campus of Memorial University of Newfoundland, Canada.

Historic estates

Harlowbury
The former manor of Harlowbury lies immediately to the north-east of the town. It was for a time a seat of the Addington family. A Norman chapel survives on the site.

Transport

Bus
Most bus services operate to nearby Harlow, with some buses also linking to other major towns such as Bishop's Stortford and Chelmsford. Some routes are operated under contract to Essex County Council (route 59 and HSB1), but most routes are operated commercially (routes 8, 10, 508, 509, 510). Routes 508, 509, 510 is the most frequent service, offering links to Harlow, Sawbridgeworth, Bishop's Stortford and Stansted Airport 24-hours a day, including Christmas Day. This is served by Arriva for all routes apart from HSB1, Arriva in which is a branch company from Deutsche Bahn.

Rail
Harlow Mill railway station, which is located in Old Harlow, is served by the West Anglia Main Line and is operated by Greater Anglia to such destinations such as Audley End, London Liverpool Street and Stratford. There is also a connection between the two main Harlow stations but it is not frequent.

Pubs
 The Chequers
 The Crown
 The Green Man
 The Marquis of Granby
 The Queen's Head Inn
 The White Horse

Schools
 Fawbert and Barnard's School
 Mark Hall Academy
 Saint Nicholas School
 Memorial University of Newfoundland – Harlow Campus

References

External links
 Visit Harlow
 Old Harlow Post Office
 Harlow Cricket Club
 Old Harlovians
 Old Harlow Fire Station
 Old Harlow Health Centre - Jenner House
 Old Harlow Dental Practice
 Fawbert and Barnard's School
 Mark Hall Academy
 Saint Nicholas School
 Harlow Campus - Memorial University of Newfoundland

Areas of Harlow
Local government in Essex
Historic districts in the United Kingdom